Budziska  is a village in the administrative district of Gmina Łubnice, within Staszów County, Świętokrzyskie Voivodeship, in south-central Poland.

The village has a population of  462.

Demography 
According to the 2002 Poland census, there were 436 people residing in Budziska village, of whom 47% were male and 53% were female. In the village, the population was spread out, with 24.5% under the age of 18, 35.1% from 18 to 44, 18.8% from 45 to 64, and 21.6% who were 65 years of age or older.
 Figure 1. Population pyramid of village in 2002 — by age group and sex

References

Villages in Staszów County